Kravchenko, Kirill Albertovich (born May 13, 1976 in Moscow) is Deputy Director General in charge of Administrative Affairs Gazprom Neft. Within Gazprom Neft is responsible to managing the organizational issues block, and for implementing several start-up projects of the company, for Operational Management System (OMS Etalon) and company safety. He is in charge of the introduction of "Digitization", a process that is implemented at the level of "Gazprom" group.

Education
1993-1998 Lomonosov Moscow State University (Sociology)
1998-2001 Lomonosov Moscow State University (PhD in Sociology)
2002-2003 The Open University (UK) (Financial Management)
2003-2004 IMD Business School (Management)
2004-2006 Mendeleev D.I. Russian University of Chemical Technology (PhD in Economics)

Career
Until 2000-work in consulting sphere
2000-2004-YUKOS in various positions in Moscow and Western Siberia
2001-2002-work in Europe and Latin America in the company Schlumberger (partnership program with the oil company YUKOS)
2004-2007-Administrative Director of JSC MKHK EuroChim, Chairman of the Board of Directors of the "Lifosa" company
In April 2007-appointed Deputy CEO, Foreign Asset Management of Gazprom Neft
From February 2009-Deputy Director General of Gazprom Neft on Foreign Asset Management
2009-2017-General director of Oil Industry of Serbia Oil industry of Serbia (NIS)
2009-2018-Member of the Board of Directors of Oil Industry of Serbia Oil industry of Serbia (NIS)
From July 2017-Deputy General Director of Gazprom neft for Administrative Affairs 
From 2017-President of Board of Directors of OOO ITSK

Awards
Golden medal of the Republic of Serbia for merits in strengthening cultural and economic ties between Serbia and Russia 2017
St. Sava medal, the highest merit of the Serbian Orthodox Church for the contribution to the development of Russian-Serbian relations and the preservation of tradition and culture 2017
National Business Award "Captains of Russian Business" 2010 in the "CEO" nomination
Award Corporate Men of the Year by the magazine "The Men" for socially responsible business operation in 2010, most influent investment in 2011, most influent strateg in 2012
Award Kapetan Miša Anastasijević for strategic management in 2011 and 2012
Commendation Honorary Citizen of Pančevo given for special contribution to the town of Pančevo
Award "Cooperation and extraordinary contribution" - Security - informative agency of Republic of Serbia
The most influent foreigner in Serbia in 2009, 2010, 2011, 2012, 2013, 2014, 2015 by expert jury of Serbian edition of daily papers of Ringier Axel Springer.

Additional Information
 Professor of Mendeleev D.I. Russian University of Chemical Technology, Gubkin Russian State University of Oil and Gas, University of Novi Sad (Serbia), Teaches at INSEAD - International business school and IEDC school at Bled in Slovenia, more than 100 books and scientific publications. He is a member of Association of independent directors in Russian Federation 

Over the years, Kirill Kravchenko was elected to the board of directors of major Russian and foreign companies (USC Slavneft, JSC Tomskneft, Lifosa company, ITSC Construction Company, EmAlliance)

Bibliography
Organizational Design and Development Management of Major Companies. K.A.Kravchenko, V.P. Meshalkin-M: Akademichesky proekt, 2006 - p. 531
Organizational Construction and Personnel Management of a Major Company - M: Akademichesky proekt, 2005.-p. 636
Guidance on Corporat Governance for Chairmen and Directors. Ed.A.A.Filatov, K.A.Kravchenko-M:Alpina Business Book, 2006.-p. 431
Modern Practice of Corporate Governance in Russian Companies. Ed. A.A.Filatov, K.A. Kravchenko-M:Alpina Business Book, 2007.-p. 244
Corporate Governance and Work of Board of Directors in Russian Companies. Ed. A.A. Filatov, K.A. Kravchenko-M: Alpina Business Book, 2007.-p. 244
Major Company Management. K.A. Kravchenko, V.P. Meshalkin-M: Akademichesky proekt, 2010.-p. 351
CEO School-Insights from 20 Global Business Leaders. S.V.Shekshnya, K.A.Kravchenko, E.Williams: , Palgrave Pivot , 2018

References 

 Kirill Kravchenko profile on Gubkin Russian State University for Oil and Gas
Dissertation - Social and economic basis of personnel planning
Dissertation at Russian Chemical -technical University Mendeleev 
Included in personnel reserve of Russian Federation President's administration
Harvard Business Review Russia: article on the occasion published "CEO school" ]

External links
Info in Kommersant

1976 births
Living people
Gazprom people
Academic staff of the D. Mendeleev University of Chemical Technology of Russia